Bluewing Creek is a  long 3rd order tributary to the Hyco River in Halifax County, Virginia.  This is the only stream of this name in the United States.

Variant names
According to the Geographic Names Information System, it has also been known historically as:
Big Bluewing Creek
Blewing Creek
Blue Wing Creek

Course
Bluewing Creek rises in a pond about 2.5 miles southeast of Triple Springs, North Carolina, and then flows generally north to join the Hyco River about 3 miles southeast of Centerville, Virginia.

Watershed
Bluewing Creek drains  of area, receives about 45.8 in/year of precipitation, has a wetness index of 394.32, and is about 57% forested.

References

Rivers of North Carolina
Rivers of Virginia
Rivers of Halifax County, Virginia
Rivers of Person County, North Carolina
Tributaries of the Roanoke River